Gemmula pseudomonilifera is a species of sea snail, a marine gastropod mollusk in the family Turridae, the turrids.

Description
The length of the shell attains 12.5 mm.

Distribution
This marine species occurs off Hawaii.

References

 Powell, A.W.B. 1967. The family Turridae in the Indo-Pacific. Part 1a. The Turrinae concluded. Indo-Pacific Mollusca 1(7): 409-443, pls 298-317

External links
 Gastropods.com: Gemmula (Gemmula) pseudomonilifera
  Tucker, J.K. 2004 Catalog of recent and fossil turrids (Mollusca: Gastropoda). Zootaxa 682:1-1295.

pseudomonilifera
Gastropods described in 1967